The Timurid Quran manuscript, also known as the Aqquyunlu Quran manuscript, is a 15th-century Timurid Quranic manuscript written on paper produced in the Ming dynasty. On 25 June 2020, it was sold at auction by Christie's for £7,016,250, surpassing its estimated value more than twelve-fold and rendering it the most expensive Quranic manuscript ever sold at the time.

Description 
The manuscript consists of 534 folios, sized 22.6 x 15.5cm, largely comprised from dyed, gold-flecked paper manufactured in Ming China. Infused with lead white, the paper is described as having a soft and silk-like texture. It is variously coloured pink, purple, cream, orange, blue and turquoise, with some pages containing depictions of landscapes, flora and birds. The Arabic is written using naskh script, with thuluth script used for titling surahs and the thirty juz'.

Controversy 
The sale of the manuscript was condemned by several academics, who argued it undermined its historical, cultural and spiritual value. Questions were also raised over its provenance, with critics stating Christie's' concealment of its details before the 1980s could obscure possible instances of looting and trafficking.

References 

Quranic manuscripts
Works of calligraphy